PSR J2032+4127, sometimes abbreviated as J2032, is a pulsar. It is accompanied by a massive Be star named MT91 213 (also 2MASS J20321312+4127243). The system is located in the constellation Cygnus (constellation) at a distance of about 1.4 kpc (~ 4570 al ) from the Sun. The system is part of the Cygnus OB2 association.

It is expected that the coming together of the two stars in early 2018 will generate high-energy phenomena.

The System has an orbital period of around 45-50 yr.

References

External links 
Astronomers Predict Fireworks from Rare Stellar Encounter in 2018 NASA
Coming Soon: Closest Approach - movie-style "preview" video from NASA about the far-ranging explorations expected during close encounter in 2018

Pulsars
Cygnus (constellation)